Three Bavarians in Bangkok (German: Drei Bayern in Bangkok) is a 1976 West German comedy film directed by Sigi Rothemund and starring Franz Muxeneder, Willy Harlander and Marie Ekorre. It was part of the tradition of Bavarian sex comedies, which increasingly utilised more exotic settings.

Synopsis
Three Bavarians travel to Bangkok, planning to start exporting German beer there.

Cast
 Franz Muxeneder as Pfarrer & Fred Greifmann 
 Willy Harlander as Sepp Ploderer 
 Marie Ekorre as Vroni 
 Gina Janssen as Emma 
 Nancy Lee Galloway as Olga 
 Jürgen Schilling as Toni Huber 
 Gerry Thiele as Florian 
 Werner Röglin as Egi Kühl 
 Grit Castell as Frau Löffler 
 Uschi Stiegelmaier as Zenzi

References

Bibliography 
 Terri Ginsberg & Andrea Mensch. A Companion to German Cinema. John Wiley & Sons, 2012.

External links 
 

1976 films
1970s sex comedy films
German sex comedy films
West German films
1970s German-language films
Films directed by Sigi Rothemund
Films scored by Gerhard Heinz
Films set in Thailand
Films shot in Thailand
Constantin Film films
1976 comedy films
1970s German films